Scottie James (born November 7, 1996)  is an American basketball player for the Tianjin Pioneers of the Chinese Basketball Association (CBA). He played college basketball for the Bradley Braves and Liberty Flames.

High school career
James grew up in Indiana but moved to Tarpon Springs, Florida. He attended Tarpon Springs High School and had his number retired after setting 14 school records. As a senior, he averaged 19.5 points, 14 rebounds, 2.8 blocks, 2.8 assists, and 1.5 steals per game. James finished his high school career with over 1,500 points and collected more than 1,000 rebounds. He committed to Bradley over offers from Wofford and Florida Gulf Coast.

College career
As a freshman at Bradley, James averaged 3.2 points and 2.6 rebounds per game. Following the season, he opted to transfer to Liberty. On February 3, 2018, he scored a career-high 26 points and grabbed nine rebounds in a 67–55 win against Longwood. James finished his redshirt sophomore season as a second-team All-Big South selection after shooting 61.6 percent from the floor and averaging 13.5 points and 8.9 rebounds per game. He was named the 2019 Atlantic Sun tournament MVP after scoring 17 points and pulling down eight rebounds in Liberty's 74–68 victory over Lipscomb in the title game. James averaged a team-leading 12.6 points and 8.6 rebounds per game as a junior, shooting 66.5 percent from the field. He was named to the First Team All-Atlantic Sun. As a senior, James averaged 10.8 points and 7.4 rebounds per game and finished first in the conference in field goal percentage (60.5 percent). At the conclusion of the regular season, James was named to the First Team All-Atlantic Sun. He finished No. 17 on the Liberty all-time scoring list with 1,323 points and fourth on the all-time rebounding list with 891.

Professional career
On August 8, 2020, James signed his first professional contract with the Gießen 46ers in Germany.

On June 18, 2021, he signed with Riesen Ludwigsburg of the Basketball Bundesliga. 

On September 4, James signed with Hapoel Haifa of the Israeli Basketball Premier League.

The Basketball Tournament
James joined War Tampa in The Basketball Tournament 2020. He finished with 7 points and 5 rebounds in the 76-53 opening-round loss to House of ‘Paign.

Personal life
James in the son of Christy and David James and has two siblings. His father played college basketball for Grace College. He led the Lancers to the 1992 NAIA Division II national championship and earned first-team All-America by the NAIA in 1993. James's mother serves as an assistant director in the Center for Academic Development at Liberty. Coach Ritchie McKay officiated James's wedding in 2019.

References

External links
Bradley Braves bio
Liberty Flames bio

1996 births
Living people
American expatriate basketball people in Germany
American expatriate basketball people in Israel
American men's basketball players
Basketball players from Florida
Bradley Braves men's basketball players
Giessen 46ers players
Hapoel Haifa B.C. players
Israeli Basketball Premier League players
Liberty Flames basketball players
People from Tarpon Springs, Florida
Power forwards (basketball)
Sportspeople from Pinellas County, Florida